Brigadier General Ibrahim Aliyu (5 May 1947 – 16 July 2021) was the Military Administrator of Jigawa State from December 1993 to August 1996 during the military regime of General Sani Abacha.

On 13 January 1996, he installed Nuhu Sanusi as first class Emir of Dutse.

Following the return to democracy, as a former military administrator he was required to retire from the army.

References

1947 births
2021 deaths
Governors of Jigawa State
Nigerian generals